The 2008 Cork Premier Intermediate Football Championship was the third staging of the Cork Premier Intermediate Football Championship since its establishment by the Cork County Board in 2006. The draw for the opening round fixtures took place on 9 December 2007. The championship began on 6 April 2008 and ended on 5 October 2008.

Mallow left the championship after securing promotion to senior level. Grenagh, St. Finbarr's and St. Vincent's joined the championship through a combination of relegation and promotion.

The final, a city derby, was played at Páirc Uí Chaoimh in Cork, between St. Finbarr's and St. Vincent's. After a replay, St. Finbarr's won the final by 2-13 to 0-14 to claim their first championship title in the grade and a first title in any football grade since 1985. It remains their only championship title in the grade.

John Paul Murphy of the St. Vincent's club was the championship's top scorer with 0-29.

Team changes

To Championship

Promoted from the Cork Intermediate Football Championship
 Grenagh

Relegated from the Cork Senior Football Championship
 St. Finbarr's
 St. Vincent's

From Championship

Promoted to the Cork Senior Football Championship
 Mallow

Results

Round 1

Round 2

Relegation playoffs

Round 3

Quarter-finals

Semi-final

Finals

Championship statistics

Top scorers

Overall

In a single game

Miscellaneous

 St. Finbarr's win their first Intermediate title.

References

Cork Premier Intermediate Football Championship